Sir Denys Colquhoun Flowerdew Lowson, 1st Baronet,   (22 January 1906 – 10 September 1975) was a British barrister and financier who served as Lord Mayor of London in 1950–51.

Early life and education
Lowson was born at Snitterfield House, Warwickshire, the third child and second son of James Gray Flowerdew Lowson, a Scottish paper manufacturer, and Adelaide Louisa Scott. His mother was born in British India, the daughter of Col. Courtenay Harvey Saltren Scott of the Bengal Staff Corps, who was born in Dublin, Ireland, and Margaret Julia Colquhoun, a novelist.

Lowson's elder brother, Courtenay Patrick Flowerdew Lowson (1897–1917), was killed in action in the First World War. His sister, Eleanor, married Maj.-Gen. William Revell Revell-Smith.

He was educated at Winchester College and Christ Church, Oxford.

Career
In 1930, was admitted as a barrister to Inner Temple. He gained prestige as a financier, specialising in unit trusts, and in the 1940s took control of the National Group of Unit Trusts. According to The Times, Lowson "showed consistently that he was more concerned to turn situations to the advantage of himself and the interests he controlled than with his fiduciary duty to the companies of which he was a director."

Lowson served as Sheriff of the City of London (1939–40), Alderman of London (1942–73) and Lord Mayor of London (1950–51). Lowson, then 44, became the youngest modern Lord Mayor upon his election. He was also High Steward of Stratford-upon-Avon in 1952 and Governor of the Royal Shakespeare Theatre in Stratford-upon-Avon. He was also a Freeman of the City of London. Lowson held a number of positions of influence in various organisations, including as governor of hospitals, a Master of livery companies and president and vice-president of multiple national and Commonwealth organisations.

He was created a Baronet Lowson, of Westlaws, County Perth on 27 June 1951.

Financial troubles and death

In July 1974, the Investors Chronicle published an exposé on Lowson, in which it revealed his financial empire was a "tangle of cross shareholdings, based on some 100 trading and industrial companies throughout the world, owned and controlled, at the end, through 14 often interrelated investment trusts." It was revealed that in 1972, Sir Denys bought shares of the National Group, which he controlled, for just 62 pence each and resold them within months for £8.67 each, for an estimated personal profit of £5 million. After an investigation requested by the Secretary of State for Trade and Industry, inspectors accused Sir Denys of "grave mismanagement" of his companies "to obtain very substantial gain for himself and his family."

Sir Denys apologised and promised to make substantial repayments, while his legal counsel blamed his mistakes on "age, ill-health, obstinacy and secretiveness rather than to any intent to deceive" — an explanation rejected by inspectors. Within a few weeks, Lowson retired from executive positions in his various companies and trusts.

His health rapidly declining, Sir Denys went on an extended cruise on the Queen Elizabeth 2. He died the following year in Marylebone, London, aged 69. He was buried at Kinfauns Parish Church in Kinfauns, Perth and Kinross, Scotland.

Following Lowson's death, Philip Inman, 1st Baron Inman wrote to The Times:

Family
On 17 July 1936, Lowson married Hon. Ann Patricia Macpherson, daughter of Ian Macpherson, 1st Baron Strathcarron. They had three children:

Sir Ian Patrick Lowson, 2nd Baronet (born 4 September 1944) married Tanya Theresa Judge
Gay Ann Lowson, Countess of Kinnoull (1938–2016), married the 15th Earl of Kinnoull 
Melanie Fiona Louisa Lowson (born 1940), married Charles Archibald Adam Black

Lady Lowson died in 2003.

References

|-

External links

1906 births
1975 deaths
People educated at Winchester College
Alumni of Christ Church, Oxford
British barristers
Sheriffs of the City of London
20th-century lord mayors of London
20th-century English politicians
Baronets in the Baronetage of the United Kingdom
British people of Scottish descent
Civic high stewards
People from Balcombe, West Sussex